Love Around the World may refer to:

Love Around the World, a 1985 album by Leon Patillo
"Love Around the World", a 2017 song by Snoop Dogg from Neva Left

See also
 Live Around the World (disambiguation)